Edward Raymond Beauvais (November 13, 1936September 28, 2021) was a business executive known for his contributions to the US airline industry. In a career spanning over 40 years, he founded three airlines including America West Airlines, which later merged with American Airlines.

Early life 
Beauvais was born Edward Raymond Beauvais on November 13, 1936, in Pueblo, Colorado. His family had French-Canadian heritage and had moved to the Colorado city, where his grandfather and father both had worked at the Colorado Fuel and Iron steel mill. He went to Saint Joseph's College, Indiana, on a sports scholarship and later moved over to Regis University in Denver. He was a talented athlete who started out playing baseball as a left-handed pitcher and a right-handed batter and was even drafted by the Baltimore Orioles as he came out of high school. However, he went on to pick up football and became an offensive lineman.

Career 

In a career spanning over 40 years, Beauvais founded three airline carriers including founding the Phoenix-based America West Airlines which eventually went on to be acquired by American Airlines. Some of his pioneering features have now become mainstay features in modern day low-cost carriers. Beauvais started his career working in the accounts department at Colorado Fuel and Iron before joining Frontier Airlines working in their finance department. He later moved on to Bonanza Air Lines and moved to Phoenix, Arizona, in 1966. He later changed careers to become a consultant in 1970 where he served clients including Continental Airlines and the City of Phoenix. This was the time when the airline industry was seeing its deregulation in 1978. In 1981, he co-founded America West Airlines with his son Mark Beauvais, Don Neilson, and Michael Roach. Deregulation of the industry had spawned other airline startups including New York Air and People Express Airlines and had launched intense price competition with the incumbents. In this environment, he started the company with $2 million in seed money and three Boeing jets which he had rented. The company was often referred to as the "pearl of deregulation" and "darling of deregulation".

America West Airlines pioneered many low-cost features, including focusing on reducing costs by having flight attendants double-up as customer service representatives. The company also brought in the first of the industry's yield management systems that aimed to maximize revenues by creating fare segments. During this time the company had the lowest cost-per-seat-mile in the industry and had one of the best on-time records. The company also enjoyed healthy relations with its employees and had become the largest carrier in Phoenix, surpassing Southwest Airlines in its very first year. It grew its fleet to include jets flying outside of the American mainland to Hawaii and Japan. However, mounting costs and increasing fuel pressures including those stemming from the First Gulf War resulted in the company heading to bankruptcy court in 1992. It was at this time that Beauvais stepped down from the company along with his son. The company, however, went on to shape the airline industry consolidation in the US. It first merged with US Airways taking the US Airways brand name, and then merged with American Airlines to become what is, as of 2021, the world's largest carrier.

Stepping down from America West in 1992, Beauvais started Western Pacific Airlines, based in Colorado, with his son Mark, and also started Mountain Air Express to serve the state's ski-tourism industry.

Beauvais was named Inc. magazine's Entrepreneur of the Year in 1989 and was inducted in the Arizona Aviation Hall of Fame in 2014.

Personal life 
Beauvais married Mary Ellen (née Talbow) in 1957. The couple had met each other in high school where he was a baseball pitcher. The couple went on to have five children. He also had an elder fraternal twin. He continued to remain connected with athletics coaching his sons' little league teams. 

Beauvais died from a heart attack while at home on September 28, 2021. He was 84.

References 

1936 births
2021 deaths
American business executives
Airline founders
Business executives
People from Pueblo, Colorado
American people of French-Canadian descent
American twins
 Regis University alumni
Saint Joseph's College (Indiana) alumni